The Dublin Adult Football League Division 1 is the top Gaelic football league in Co. Dublin. The 2013 champions are St Brigids who beat St Sylvesters in the final in Balgriffin.

Roll of honour

References

1